Michael Dennis may refer to:
 Michael Aaron Dennis, American author
 Michael J. Dennis, African-American filmmaker and film promoter
 Michael Dennis (artist) (born 1944), Canadian-American artist
 Michael Dennis (skier) (born 1944), New Zealand Olympic skier  
 Mike Dennis (born 1944), American football player
 Mick Dennis (born 1952), sportswriter
 Michael Dennis, Canadian-American artist

See also
 Michael Denis (1729–1800), Austrian poet